Sutekh, the alias of Seth Joshua Horvitz, is a music composer and performer of experimental electronic and techno music. He has released on several international record labels such as Mille Plateaux, Plug Research, Soul Jazz, Leaf, Kit Clayton's Orthlorng Musork and his own Context Free Media.

He performed under the name Moron together with Safety Scissors, with whom he shared a flat in Oakland in 1997. Along with Kit Clayton, the three released two albums as Pigeon Funk (the second one without Safety Scissors). He has also performed and recorded under the names Rrose and Suite K.

Horvitz was born in 1973 and grew up in Venice Beach. He holds a BA in Cognitive Science from the University of California at Berkeley (1995) and an MFA in Electronic Music and Recording Media from Mills College (2010).

Discography

Albums
 Periods.Make.Sense (2000), Force Inc. Music Works
 Deadpan Escapement: Reconstructed with Twerk (2000), Context Free Media
 Fell (2002), Orthlorng Musork
 Incest Live (2002), Force Inc. Music Works
 On Bach (2010), Creaked Records

References

Living people
Year of birth missing (living people)